Íñigo Vélez de Guevara (1597–1658), 8th Count of Oñate , was a Spanish political figure.

Biography 
He was the son of Íñigo Vélez de Guevara and Catalina Vélez, 5th Countess of Oñate. His younger brother was Beltrán, Viceroy of Sardinia.

He was Spanish ambassador in London and Rome.He played an important role in crushing the Neapolitan revolt of 1647 led by Masaniello. Oñate was the eventual vanquisher of the "Neapolitan Republic" and commissioned the Fontana della Sellaria to commemorate his victory.

He later served as viceroy of the Kingdom of Naples (from 1648) (see List of Spanish Viceroys of Naples), where he repulsed a French attack during the Franco-Spanish War (1635).At his return in Spain he was made State Councilor and received the title of Marqués de Guevara.

He married Antonia Manrique de la Cerda and had two daughters:
 Catalina, first married her uncle Beltrán Vélez Ladrón de Guevara and then Ramiro Núñez de Guzmán, Duke of Medina de las Torres and viceroy of Naples;
 Mariana, married Juan Domingo Ramírez de Arellano.

External links
 Linaje, poder y cultura : el gobierno de Íñigo Vélez de Guevara, VIII Conde Oñate, en Nápoles (1648-1653)

1597 births
1658 deaths
Viceroys of Naples
Inigo
Spanish diplomats